Phillips Wesley Robbins is a Professor Emeritus in the Department of Molecular and Cell Biology at the Boston University School of Dental Medicine. He moved to BU in 1998 following a career of almost 40 years on the faculty at the Massachusetts Institute of Technology.

Early life and education
Robbins was born in 1930 in Barre, Massachusetts and attended high school in West Springfield, Massachusetts. He later described a high school physics course as an inspiration for his plans for a science career, though he continued to consider following the family tradition by becoming a medical missionary. He settled on biochemistry as his chosen field as an undergraduate at DePauw University, from which he graduated in 1952. He received his Ph.D. in 1955 from the University of Illinois under the supervision of Herbert E. Carter and then became a postdoctoral fellow with Fritz Lipmann, first at Massachusetts General Hospital and then moving with the group to Rockefeller University.

Academic career
Robbins joined the faculty at the Massachusetts Institute of Technology in 1960 as one of several young biochemists hired by Jack Buchanan into the Department of Biology. There he worked particularly closely with Salvador Luria, studying the structure and biochemistry of lipopolysaccharides.

In 1998, after nearly 40 years at MIT, Robbins moved to the Boston University School of Dental Medicine, where he has worked in collaboration with John Samuelson and with two of his own former postdoctoral fellows, department head Carlos Hirschberg and associate dean Maria Kukuruzinska.

Robbins received the Eli Lilly Award in Biological Chemistry in 1966, was elected to the National Academy of Sciences in 1982 and received the Karl Meyer Award for Lifetime Achievement in Glycobiology in 2000.

Research
Robbins' research has focused on a variety of biochemical pathways. In his early career at MIT, he worked closely with Luria studying the structure and biosynthesis of lipopolysaccharides, including elucidating the structure of bactoprenol and identifying the direction of chain elongation in LPS synthesis in bacteria. He later moved on to studying the biochemistry of the eukaryotic N-linked glycosylation pathway and more recently, with John Samuelson, has studied the evolution of this pathway in protists. He has also worked on the problem of chitin synthesis and its role in yeast.

References

1930 births
Living people
Boston University faculty
American biochemists
Members of the National Academy of Medicine